Carmen Llorca Villaplana (November 29, 1921, in Alcoy – June 29, 1998, in Madrid) was a Spanish historian, writer, and politician. As a professor of history at the University of Alcalá, her work focused on Elizabeth II and Emilio Castelar. From 1982 to 1986, she served on the Congress of Deputies, and from 1986 to 1994, she served at the European Parliament. She was decorated with the Civil Order of Alfonso X, the Wise and the Ordre des Arts et des Lettres.

References 

1921 births
1998 deaths
Spanish women historians
Spanish politicians
20th-century Spanish historians